Vectocleidus is an extinct genus of leptocleidid plesiosaurian known from the Early Cretaceous Vectis Formation (late Barremian stage) of Isle of Wight, in the United Kingdom. It contains a single species, Vectocleidus pastorum.

See also

 List of plesiosaur genera
 Timeline of plesiosaur research

References

Early Cretaceous plesiosaurs of Europe
Fossil taxa described in 2012
Taxa named by Darren Naish
Sauropterygian genera
Plesiosaurs